Novatek is Russia's second-largest natural gas producer (behind Gazprom), and the seventh-largest publicly traded company globally by natural gas production volume. The company was originally known as OAO FIK Novafininvest.  Novatek is based in the Yamalo-Nenets Autonomous Region in West Siberia, and maintains a sales office in Moscow. In the 2020 Forbes Global 2000, Novatek was ranked as the 316th-largest public company in the world.

The company is not to be confused with Novatek Inc, a US company that produces synthetic diamonds for the oil and gas industry, or Novatek Microelectronics Corp., a supplier of display controller integrated circuits, or Novatek AS, a Norwegian engineering company.

Operations
In 2006, the company produced roughly thirty billion cubic metres (1.1 trillion cubic feet) of natural gas. Total reserves amount to  using the Securities and Exchange Commission methodology. Regarding dry sales gas, Novatek operates only in the domestic market, which is characterized by artificially low prices. Novatek's earnings before interest, taxes, depreciation, and amortization and net profit margin in 2011 were 49% and 32%, respectively.

The major gas field owned by Novatek is the Yurkharovskoye field.   On 27 May 2009, Novatek bought a 51% stake in Yamal LNG from Volga Resources, which controls the giant South-Tambeyskoye field.  On 2 July 2010, Novatek purchased Tambeyneftegas, which holds the licence to the Arctic Malo-Yamalskoye field, located on the Yamal Peninsula and holding  of natural gas and 14.4 million tonnes of gas condensate.

In June 2010 Novatek and Gazprom announced plans to build a liquefied natural gas plant in Yamalo-Nenets Autonomous Okrug.  Total S.A. will also be involved as a 20% shareholder.

In was announced in July 2010 that, together with Total S.A., Novatek is developing the Termokarstovoye field in Yamal.

In December 2010, Novatek bought a 51% stake in Sibneftegaz from Gazprombank (Itera owns 49% of the shares).  Sibneftegaz holds licences for exploration and production in the Yamal-Nenets region, including for the Beregovoye field, Pyreinoye field, Zapadno-Zapolyarnoye field, and the Khadyryakhinskiy licence area.  Sibneftegaz owns rights to develop oil and gas condensate fields with a total resource of 395.53 bcm of natural gas and 8.44 million tonnes of gas condensate.

In 2011, Novatek was awarded licences to develop the Geofizichenskoye field, Salmanovskoye (Utrenneye) field, Severo-Obskoye field, and Vostochno-Tambeiskoye field.

In addition, Novatek acquired these companies:
SNP Nova – pipeline construction
Purneftegasgeologiya – natural gas
Tarkosaleneftegas – natural gas
Khancheyneftegas – natural gas
Yurkharovneftegas – natural gas

It was announced in 2013 that Novatek would develop the Sabetta port, in a joint project with the Russian government. This port would allow LNG exports by sea from the Yamal Peninsula.

The final investment decision on Novatek's Arctic LNG 2 project was made in March 2019.

In September 2021, Yamal SPG Resurs of Novatek bought Arkticheskoye and Neytinskoye fields for 10,88 and 2,28 billion dollars respectively for further geological study of subsurface resources, exploitation and production. A very special term of the auction sale was the participation of Novatek structures only.

Novatek has been ranked as being among the 13th-best of 92 oil, gas, and mining companies on indigenous rights in the Arctic.

In 2021, Novatek was ranked no. 19 in the Arctic Environmental Responsibility Index (AERI) that covers 120 oil, gas, and mining companies involved in resource extraction north of the Arctic Circle.

Ownership
Novatek is a public company with shares traded on the London and Moscow stock exchanges. The major shareholders of Novatek are Leonid Michelson, the CEO, with around 28% of the shares, Volga Group with 23% of shares, Total S.A. with 16%, and Gazprom with 9.4%.

Controversies 
On July 16, 2014, Novatek was placed on the Sectoral Sanctions Identification list by the U.S. Department of the Treasury following Russia’s continued attempts to destabilize eastern Ukraine.

On January 29, 2018, CEO Leonid Mikhelson was named in a Countering America's Adversaries Through Sanctions Act report delivered to Congress.

In September 2021, CFO Mark Gyetvay was arrested in the United States. He allegedly hid $93M worth of assets in offshore accounts. If convicted, he could face a decades-long prison sentence. He has since been released on a $80M bond.

In April 2022, former Deputy Chairman on the Board of Directors, Sergey Protosenya, reportedly stunned his wife and daughter with an axe and then stabbed them to death before hanging himself, at a luxury villa in Lloret de Mar, Spain. He had a fortune of over $400 million. Two other similar reports of gas company executives killing their wives and children emerged around the same time in Moscow. Investigators have not found evidence of third parties in spite of the case not looking like a typical murder-suicide.
Novatek issued a statement casting doubt on a murder-suicide theory.

See also

 Subsidiaries and affiliates of Total S. A.

References

External links
 
 
 Novatek - information and analytics

Companies based in Yamalo-Nenets Autonomous Okrug
Companies listed on the Moscow Exchange
Gazprom
PAO Novatek
Natural gas companies of Russia
Russian brands